Lorie Zapf (pronounced "Zaff") is an American politician in San Diego, California. She served as a San Diego City Council member representing City Council District 2. She was first elected to office in November 2010 serving District 6, but switched districts in 2014 due to redistricting. In 2018 Zapf lost a bid for reelection, becoming one of the first incumbent council members to lose a reelection campaign since 1992. She is a Republican, although city council positions are officially nonpartisan per California state law.

San Diego City Council 
When she was elected to District 6 in 2010, it included the neighborhoods of Bay Ho, Bay Park, Clairemont Mesa, Fashion Valley, Kearny Mesa, Linda Vista, Mission Valley, North Clairemont, and Serra Mesa. Her home in Bay Ho, was moved to District 2 in the 2011 redistricting. She ran for the vacant District 2 seat under the new borders in 2014 and won election to that seat in the June primary, by getting more than 50% of the vote (53.65%). The other neighborhoods in the new District 2 included Bay Park, Morena, Midway/North Bay, Mission Beach, Ocean Beach, Pacific Beach, and Point Loma.

In the November 2018 election, Zapf lost her reelection bid to retired doctor Jen Campbell. This marked the first time that an incumbent had failed to be reelected to the City Council since 1992.

Committee assignments 
 Economic Development and Intergovernmental Relations Committee 
 Infrastructure Committee
 Audit Committee (Chair)
 Public Safety and Livable Neighborhoods Committee
 Budget Review Committee
 Select Committee on Homelessness

Source: Office of the City Clerk

Personal
She was born in Los Angeles; her mother was a first-generation Mexican American. She is the first Latina to serve on the city council. She and her husband Eric founded a business, Boulder Bar Endurance, a line of food bars sold through health food stores. They sold the company to MAF Bionutritionals in 2002 but remained active in its operation. She has lived in Bay Ho for 17 years with her husband and two daughters.

Electoral history

References

American politicians of Mexican descent
Living people
San Diego City Council members
Hispanic and Latino American women in politics
California State University, Northridge alumni
University of Denver alumni
California Republicans
Mexican-American people in California politics
Women city councillors in California
Year of birth missing (living people)
21st-century American women